Vipers is a 2008 American television film directed by Bill Corcoran and starring Tara Reid and Jonathan Scarfe. It premiered on the Sci Fi Channel on September 21, 2008, and was released on DVD on September 23, 2008. The name of the film was inspired by the Co/Ed softball team of the same name, playing games in the summer months throughout the Capital Region. It is the 12th film of the Maneater Series.

Plot

Universal Bio Tech Research Facility is secretly working on scientifically enhancing lethal horned viper snakes with C12, a poison, for their venom to cure disease. Mr. Staffin surprises the staff when he shows up to witness the procedure a day ahead of schedule. Dr. Akim explains to Staffin that the snakes tore through their original cages and murdered a tech, a wrangler, and two more staff members trying to contain them. Staffin then subdues everybody in the room, and orders his own men to load the snakes. Dr. Akim manages to shoot the glass of the tank, releasing the snakes, before Staffin shoots him with another sleep dart. The snakes kill everybody except Staffin, who manages to escape.

At the Universal Bio Tech Headquarters, Dr. Vera Collins is giving a presentation on the results, explaining how the enhanced venom cured a 28-year old woman of breast cancer. Mr. Burton tells Dr. Collins there has been a break-in at one of the facilities, but Dr. Collins is horrified to learn that the snakes were enhanced without her knowledge or approval and claims its unethical. Mr. Burton tells Vera that the snakes need to be captured immediately due to the dangerous mutations of the snakes that have developed.

The snakes now repopulate at an increasing rate and are uncontrollable, fast, strong and ravenous. Meanwhile, on the island of Eden Cove, a newlywed couple is murdered on the beach after participating in sexual intercourse in their tent. The mutilated bodies are found by a young mysterious Cal Taylor and local man Hank Brownie, who notices a rental jeep with the doors wide open. They find the woman's wedding ring and take it down to Sheriff Tom Hendricks who walks in on Jack, who owns the local inn, and Georgie, who owns the car rental, flirting around and asks Georgie to check on the info for the found jeep. He shows disdain for their tomfoolery because Jack is still only separated from his wife and Tom's friend, Ellie. Cal admits he has come to Eden to see Doc Silverton. Jack helps Cal check into the inn, but get interrupted by Ellie and their teenage daughter Maggie who accuses her dad of sleeping around and says that she refuses to move and start over at a new school before running off. Cal visits Doc Jim Silverton, bringing him his deceased son Joey's things as Doc mourns the fact his son's remains cannot be transferred to the states to be buried. Doc gets a call from Sheriff Tom saying Maggie broke into Nicky's place and smoked pot and asks him to handle it. When Doc and Cal get to The Garden, owner Nicky, Maggie, Ellie and Jack are all in a dispute. It is revealed that Doc is retiring and Cal may take over for him.

Ellie and Nicky get into a physical altercation before they hear screaming outside from a woman named Emily Willis. Her child, Jake, was bitten on his abdomen by a snake. Nicky rushes Cal and Jake to the clinic and Cal injects him with antivenom, stabilizing him. Doc leaves town to take Jake to a hospital with Cal subbing in for him, and Nicky is taken to prison for growing pot. Meanwhile, Vera Collins tells Burton she only has a limited supply of C12 which will immobilize the snakes only for a short period, but she does not know the effects it will have on enhanced snakes, and points out that C12 will also kill humans. Burton tells Vera there has been a snakebite incident and she needs to examine the child bitten and determine if it is one of their vipers, and to contain the problem on Eden if so. He then introduces Jon Staffin as his security chief and sends them out. On Eden, Jack drives Maggie back to the inn, and promises she can be ungrounded around him, but she gets angry when Georgie shows up and storms off. Maggie walks past Hank Brownie as he reels in a half eaten dead fish out of the water and is disgusted, but Brownie mentions he has never seen anything like it.

Sheriff Tom visits Cal at the clinic while he is patching up Ellie, who insists on pressing charges against Nicky for assault. Tom asks if she is overreacting, and Ellie accuses him of having feelings for Nicky, but he denies it. Cal gets a call from Doc who says Jake is getting worse, and that the bite had an unusual amount of venom in it, and says that while they have no more antivenom, he will be back in the morning and they should be fine. When they get off the phone, Vera Collins and Staffin ask to speak to Doc. Jack and Georgie, who have just finished sexual intercourse, are in the inn and Georgie is attempting to sleep while Jack showers. Georgie thinks Jack is teasing her again, but is attacked by the vipers and killed. Tom takes Cal to examine Nicky, still in prison. They speak about Joey, and Nicky shows remorse and sorrow about his death and the fight they had before he enlisted and left, ultimately leading to his death, then Cal exits, leaving his tools which Nicky uses to pick the lock and escape. Brownie shows Tom the lake, full of half devoured fish carcasses. At the inn, Jack finishes dressing in the restroom and enters the room to find Georgie's body. Cal and Nicky stumble upon Jack in a panic state, and Cal narrowly saves Nicky from a viper. They carry Jack's body away as fast as possible because Georgie's body is covered in vipers.

Down at the lake, Tom finds more vipers, and unknowingly tells everyone to run for the hotel, however Maggie runs the wrong way in fear and does not reach inn. The snakes intrude the inn lobby where everyone is hiding, but Cal scares them off with a fire extinguisher. Against Tom's orders, Ellie leaves to find Maggie. She finds her, but they get surrounded on the bridge with no way out. Tom shows up and saves Maggie, who can not walk, and locks her in the safe room at the sheriff's office. Tom is killed by the snakes and Jack saves Ellie. They get cornered outside the office, but Cal and Nicky once more use the extinguisher to deter the snakes while they all hide in a van. Cal jumps out of the van and uses the extinguisher while rescuing Maggie and returning to the van, but Cal gets bitten in the process. The van refuses to start and they have to run for the closest place, the cafe back entrance, but Ellie gets attacked, and Cal barricades himself, an upset Maggie, and Nicky into the back room of the cafe using ice, inferring that they do not like the cold. They all bond over grievances of losing somebody they loved as Maggie mourns the supposed loss of her parents while Doc, Staffin and Vera show up to the island and are horrified by the scene they find, dozens of snakes still eating the bodies of dozens of corpses. They use grenades of C12 to subdue the snakes while making their way to the inn, while Jack is shown to be alive and finds Maggie, Nicky and Cal to take them to the inn also. One of the men with the rescue, Simpson, is taken down by a snake, and Vera is repulsed by Staffin's order to move on.

Everyone meets up at the inn, and Vera tells everyone to go inside. Vera explains that rescue is not coming until morning, but the townspeople are restless and try to leave using the boat Bio Tech arrived on. This leads to a physical altercation in which Jack gets shot. The townspeople angrily leave the inn while Maggie has to be pulled away by Cal. Several people are attacked as they attempt to make it to the boats, and the remainder retreat back to the inn. Cal tries to save Jack, who is rapidly bleeding out, but Jack succumbs to his injuries despite Cal's efforts, and Nicky comforts Maggie. While in the bathroom, Cal finds Vera sick to her stomach and sobbing. Cal snaps at her, but she claims it is not her fault. Nicky bursts in and states that the snakes are all trying to get in now. Doc kills one, and they try to barricade the doors. One of Staffin's men, Lewison, cracks and tells the truth, that they were not there to rescue the town, they were sent to gather a few of the vipers and take them back, and that aircraft were coming in the morning to gas the entire island, killing everyone and everything left by then. Vera is shocked to hear this news, along with everyone else.

Cal, Doc, and Vera concoct a plan to lure the snakes off the boat so they can call off the airstrike and escape. Staffin secretly scolds Lewison for revealing plans, and tells him there is a contingency plan, as long as he can trust Lewison. Doc leads everyone in prayer as Cal and Nicky share a kiss in the backroom. Maggie guides everyone downstairs to where her dad stores a truck, and they attach any heat sources they can to it. Maggie wants to help, and Cal tells her to help Doc get to the boats so he can call off the airstrike. Lewison drives the truck while Cal, Staffin, Nicky, Vera and Brownie attract the snakes with heat and guide them to the greenhouse, where Cal plans to trap and kill them. Doc guides the rest of the townspeople to the boats, but when he tries to get ahold of the truck over the walkie talkies, he does not get a response and suspects something is wrong. Maggie takes off but Doc can not chase after her and departs with the boat. The truck has succeeded in guiding the snakes to the greenhouse, and they rush inside. Lewison is bitten, and Maggie shows up with more C12 to temporarily subdue the snakes, saving Cal. Vera uses fertilizer and gasoline to create bombs while the snakes slowly weaken the glass until they eventually get in. Staffin gets bitten and goes down. When he dies, they realize he had a radio on him the entire time, disproving his earlier lies that he did not have means of communication to call off the airstrike and realize he was planning to escape by himself and leave everyone else to die. Vera demands Burton call it off, but he thanks her for her scientific sacrifice and turns his radio off. Cal tries to radio Homeland Security, but they tell him Eden is under quarantine and the radio gets jammed by Bio Tech. Brownie accidentally shoots and cracks the glass roof and the snakes begin climbing in, killing Brownie.

Nicky and Vera use flares and propane tanks to ignite the greenhouse, causing a huge explosion. In the distance, they see the aircraft coming, but are relieved to realize Doc got through when they do not gas the island. Meanwhile, Burton is giving a speech about Bio Tech's profits to interviewers when his walkie talkie conversation with Vera admitting his plan to kill everyone to cover himself is played over the intercom. Burton is arrested, with Vera watching. It is revealed that Cal made the recording and was playing it over their speaker system through his computer. Burton is out on bail and is getting into a vehicle while on the phone making plans to make everything disappear when he is promptly attacked and killed by a snake hiding in his car.

Cast
 Tara Reid as Nicky Swift
 Jonathan Scarfe as Cal Taylor
 Corbin Bernsen as Burton
 Genevieve Buechner as Maggie Martin
 Aaron Pearl as Jack Martin
 Mercedes McNab as Georgie
 Claire Rankin as Ellie Martin
 Michael Kopsa as John Staffen
 Jessica Steen as Dr. Collins
 Don S. Davis as Dr. Silverton
 Mark Humphrey as Sheriff Hendricks
 Ellen Mcgillveray as Body On Bridge

Reception
Dread Central said, "Vipers is the sort of nature gone amok movie that if it had been made 20-30 years ago, we’d be looking back on it today saying it may not have been a very good movie but we enjoyed it anyway."

References

External links

2008 television films
2008 horror films
English-language Canadian films
2000s English-language films
Maneater (film series)
Canadian natural horror films
Films about snakes
Syfy original films
Films directed by Bill Corcoran
2008 films
Canadian horror drama films
Canadian comedy horror films
Canadian horror television films
Canadian comedy-drama films
2000s American films
2000s Canadian films